Hannah Osborne is a New Zealand rower.

Hannah Osborne may also refer to:

 Hannah Osborne (Hollyoaks), fictional character in Hollyoaks
 Hannah Osborne (The Handmaid's Tale), fictional character in The Handmaid's Tale